{{DISPLAYTITLE: 1-deoxy-D-xylulose-5-phosphate synthase}}

In enzymology, a 1-deoxy--xylulose-5-phosphate synthase is an enzyme in the non-mevalonate pathway that catalyzes the chemical reaction

pyruvate + -glyceraldehyde 3-phosphate  1-deoxy--xylulose 5-phosphate + CO2

Thus, the two substrates of this enzyme are pyruvate and -glyceraldehyde 3-phosphate, whereas its two products are 1-deoxy--xylulose 5-phosphate and CO2.

This enzyme belongs to the family of transferases, specifically those transferring aldehyde or ketonic groups (transaldolases and transketolases, respectively).  The systematic name of this enzyme class is pyruvate:-glyceraldehyde-3-phosphate acetaldehydetransferase (decarboxylating). Other names in common use include 1-deoxy--xylulose-5-phosphate pyruvate-lyase (carboxylating), and DXP-synthase.  This enzyme participates in biosynthesis of steroids.

Structural studies

References

 
 

EC 2.2.1
Enzymes of known structure